William Spencer may refer to:

Politicians
 William Spencer (MP for Bristol), MP of Bristol 1467
 William Spencer (MP for Ipswich) (by 1473–1529 or later), MP for Ipswich 1510
 William Spencer (Sheriff) (c.1496–1532), High Sheriff of Northamptonshire 1531
 William Spencer (MP for Ripon), MP for Ripon 1584–1586
 William Spencer, 2nd Baron Spencer (1591–1636), British peer and MP for Brackley 1614 and Northamptonshire 1620–22 & 1624–27
 William Spencer (settler) (1825–1901), early settler and MP in Western Australia
 William B. Spencer (1835–1882), U.S. Representative from Louisiana
 William R. Spencer, Suffolk County Legislator, New York

Fictional characters
 Bill Spencer, Jr., a fictional character from the American soap opera The Bold and the Beautiful
 Bill Spencer, Sr., a fictional character from the American soap opera The Bold and the Beautiful

Sports
 William Spencer (athlete) (1900–1983), American Olympic athlete
 William Spencer (footballer) (1903–1969), English footballer for Crewe Alexandra and Stoke City
 William Spencer (cyclist) (1895–1963), American bicycle racer
 Willie Spencer (baseball) (born 1914), American Negro leagues baseball player
 Bill Spencer (rugby league), Australian rugby league footballer on 1929–30 Kangaroo tour of Great Britain
 Bill Spencer (biathlete), American biathlete who competed at the 1964 and 1968 Winter Olympics
 Bill Spencer (cross-country skier), American cross-country skier at the 1988 Winter Olympics

Writers
 William Browning Spencer (born 1946), American writer
 William Robert Spencer (1769–1834), British poet

Others
 William Spencer (judge) (1782–1871), American lawyer, judge, postmaster and state representative
 William Spencer (navigational instrument maker) (c.1751–c.1816), English mathematical instrument maker
 William George Spencer (1790–1866), English schoolmaster and tutor, known as a mathematical writer
 William Spencer (silent film actor) (fl. 1920s), American actor
 William J. Spencer (1867–1933), American labor leader
 William Henry Spencer (1857–1925), Afro-American educator

See also
 Spencer (surname)